Nasrdin Dchar (born 5 November 1978) is a Moroccan-Dutch actor and presenter.

Career 
Dchar has acted in many theatre productions. His first important television appearance was in Cut, a popular youth series of BNN. He is also seen in soap opera Onderweg naar Morgen, Eddy Terstall's Mannenharem and as a lead character in drama series VARA Deadline. He also presents AVRO ''. Dchar is a Muslim and when he played a gay man in Mannenharem it caused some controversy within the Dutch Islamic community. He also played in the film Rabat, a role for which he received the prestigious Gouden Kalf award for Best Actor on 30 September 2011. He played Felix Halverstad in the 2012 Dutch film Süskind. In 2013 he played a gay nurse (Omar Sahar) in the television series "Charlie" (Dutch remake of Nurse Jackie).

Personal life 
Dchar is married with two children.

References

External links
 

1978 births
Living people
21st-century Dutch male actors
Dutch television presenters
Dutch Muslims
Dutch people of Moroccan descent
Golden Calf winners
People from Steenbergen
Dutch male actors
Dutch male film actors
Dutch male television actors
Dutch male soap opera actors